Nitzsch is a surname, and may refer to:
Karl Ludwig Nitzsch (1751–1831), a German theologian
His better-known son, Karl Immanuel Nitzsch (1787-1868), a Lutheran church leader
Friedrich August Nitzsch (1832–1898), German theologian and son of Karl Immanuel
Christian Ludwig Nitzsch (1782-1837), a German zoologist
Gregor Wilhelm Nitzsch (1790-1861), a German classical scholar known chiefly for his writings on Homeric epic
Karl Wilhelm Nitzsch (1818–1880), a German historian, son of Gregor Wilhelm Nitzsch.

See also
 Tzsch

German-language surnames